In Tahiti and Society Islands mythology, Pahuanui  or Pahuanuiapitaaiterai is a sea monster.

References

Tahiti and Society Islands mythology
Polynesian legendary creatures